Elamkadu is a village in Kottayam, Kerala, India. 
The nearest city is Mundakayam which lies 14 km to the south of Elamkadu. The closest transport links are the railway station in Kottayam and the airport in Kochin.
The Manimalayar river, also known locally as the Pullakayar,  originates in the nearby Elamkadu hills.

References

Villages in Kottayam district